Ann Chamberlyne (1667–1691) was a female tar (sailor) who joined her brother's ship's crew in 1690 and fought the French at Beachy Head. A plaque in her memory at All Saints Church, Cheyne Walk in London used to exist, but it was destroyed in World War II during a bombing raid.

The plaque stated:
In an adjoining vault lies Anne, the only Daughter of Edward Chamberlyne, Doctor of Law's, born in London, 20 January 1667, who having declined marriage at 23, and aspiring to great achievements unusual to her sex, and age, on 30 June 1690, on board a fire ship in man's clothing, as second Pallas, chaste and fearless, fought valiantly six hours against the French, under the command of her Brother.

Returned from the engagement and after some few months married John Spragg, Esq., with whom, for sixteen more months, she lived most amiably happy. At length, in childbed of a daughter, she encountered death 30 October 1691. This monument, for consort most virtuous and dearly loved, was erected by her husband.

Snatched, alas, how soon by sudden death, unhonoured by progeny like herself, worthy to rule the Main!"

She is the first known female tar in British history.

References
 Helena Carreiras, Gerhard Kümme: Women in the Military and in Armed Conflict. 
 Joan Druett: She Captains: Heroines and Hellions of the Sea (2001)
 Isabelle Bauino, Jacques Carré, Cécile Révauger: The Invisible Woman: Aspects of Women's Work in Eighteenth-century Britain

1667 births
1691 deaths
Deaths in childbirth
Female wartime cross-dressers
Royal Navy sailors
Military personnel from London
Women in 17th-century warfare
17th-century Royal Navy personnel
Women in war in Britain